Soloveni Nakaunicina (born 4 July 1974) is a Fijian former sprinter. He competed in the men's 4 × 100 metres relay at the 1996 Summer Olympics.

References

External links

1974 births
Living people
Athletes (track and field) at the 1996 Summer Olympics
Fijian male sprinters
Olympic athletes of Fiji
Athletes (track and field) at the 1998 Commonwealth Games
Commonwealth Games competitors for Fiji
Place of birth missing (living people)
20th-century Fijian people
21st-century Fijian people